Idan Sade (born 8 May 1988) is an Israeli footballer who plays for Hapoel Ashdod.

References

External links

1988 births
Living people
Israeli footballers
Israel under-21 international footballers
F.C. Ashdod players
Enosis Neon Paralimni FC players
Hapoel Bnei Lod F.C. players
Hapoel Kfar Saba F.C. players
Hapoel Jerusalem F.C. players
Maccabi Kiryat Gat F.C. players
Hapoel Ashkelon F.C. players
Hakoah Maccabi Amidar Ramat Gan F.C. players
Hapoel Bnei Ashdod F.C. players
Israeli expatriate footballers
Expatriate footballers in Cyprus
Israeli expatriate sportspeople in Cyprus
Israeli Premier League players
Liga Leumit players
Cypriot First Division players
Footballers from Ashdod
Association football midfielders